The 2021–22 First Division League (known as the Yelo League for sponsorship reasons) was the 1st season of the Saudi First Division League after its rebrand, and the 45th season of the Saudi First Division since its establishment in 1976. The season started on 6 September 2021 and concluded on 28 May 2022.

All three teams were promoted on the final day of the season. Al-Khaleej were promoted and crowned champions following a 0–0 away draw with Najran. Al-Adalah were promoted following a 0–0 draw away to Jeddah. Al-Wehda were promoted following a 3–0 away win against Al-Diriyah.

Bisha were the first team to be relegated on 5 May. They were relegated following a 2–1 defeat away to Al-Adalah. Al-Kawkab were relegated a day later following a 2–0 home defeat to Al-Jabalain. Al-Nahda became the third side to be relegated following a 3–0 defeat away to Ohod on 18 May. On 23 May, Al-Diriyah became the fourth side to be relegated despite a 2–1 away win against Bisha. On the final matchday, Al-Jeel became the fifth and final side to be relegated despite a 2–1 away win against Al-Nahda.

Overview

Changes
On 9 October 2020, the Saudi FF announced that the number of teams in the league would be decreased to 18 starting from the 2022–23 season. To prepare for these changes it was announced that 5 teams would be relegated in the 2021–22 season and only 3 teams would be promoted from the 2021–22 Second Division.

Rebrand
On 26 August 2021, the newly appointed executive director of the FDL, Talal Al-Obaidi, announced a rebrand; beginning with the 2021–22 season, the competition would be known as the First Division League (FDL). As part of the rebranding, a new logo was introduced.

Name sponsorship
On 1 September 2021, the FDL announced a sponsorship with car rental company Yelo. As part of the sponsorship deal, the First Division League would be known as the Yelo League for the next 3 seasons.

Team changes
The following teams have changed division since the 2021–22 season.

To the First Division League
Promoted from Second Division
 Al-Okhdood
 Al-Orobah
 Al-Kholood
 Bisha

Relegated from Pro League
 Al-Qadsiah
 Al-Wehda
 Al-Ain

From the First Division League
Promoted to Pro League
 Al-Hazem
 Al-Fayha
 Al-Tai

Relegated to Second Division
 Al-Bukayriyah
 Al-Thoqbah
 Arar
 Al-Nojoom

Teams
A total of 20 teams are contesting the league, including 13 sides from the 2020–21 season, 4 promoted teams from the Second Division and the three relegated sides from the Pro League.

The first club to be relegated to the First Division League was Al-Ain, who were relegated after only a year in the top flight 2–0 defeat away to Al-Nassr on 14 May 2021. In the final matchday, both Al-Qadsiah and Al-Wehda were relegated following a draw with Abha and a loss against Al-Shabab respectively. Al-Qadsiah were relegated after only a year in the top flight while Al-Wehda were relegated after three years in the top flight.

The first club to be promoted was Al-Orobah who were promoted despite a 1–0 away defeat to Afif on 27 March 2021. On 3 April 2021, both Al-Okhdood and Bisha were promoted. Al-Okhdood were promoted following a 1–1 draw with Al-Taqadom while Bisha were promoted following a 2–0 win over Al-Jandal. The final club to be promoted was Al-Kholood, who were promoted following a 3–1 away win over Al-Dahab in the final matchday.

Al-Okhdood defeated Al-Orobah 4–2 on penalties (3–3 after extra time) to win their second title and first since 1992.

Al-Kholood and Bisha will play in the First Division League for the first time in their history. Al-Orobah return after an absence of two seasons and will play in their 13th overall season in the First Division League. Al-Okhdood return to the First Division League for the first time since the 1992–93 season. They will play in their 2nd season in the First Division League.

Stadia and locations

Note: Table lists in alphabetical order.

Foreign players
On 26 June 2021, the Saudi FF announced that the number of foreign players was increased from 4 players to 5 players.

Players name in bold indicates the player is registered during the mid-season transfer window.

League table

Positions by round
The table lists the positions of teams after each week of matches. In order to preserve chronological evolvements, any postponed matches are not included in the round at which they were originally scheduled but added to the full round they were played immediately afterward.

Results

Statistics

Scoring

Top scorers

Hat-tricks 

Note
(H) – Home; (A) – Away4 Player scored 4 goals

Clean sheets

Awards

Round awards

Number of teams by region

See also
 2021–22 Saudi Professional League
 2021–22 Saudi Second Division
 2021–22 Saudi Third Division

References

2
Saudi First Division League seasons
Saudi